Dato' Ir. Ahmad Zakiyuddin bin Abdul Rahman (born 1959) is a Malaysian politician who has served as the Deputy Chief Minister of Penang I and Member of the Penang State Executive Council (EXCO) in the Pakatan Harapan (PH) state administration under Chief Minister Chow Kon Yeow and Member of the Penang State Legislative Assembly (MLA) for Pinang Tunggal since May 2018. He has also served as Deputy President of the Penang Islamic Religious Council since 2018. He is a member of the People's Justice Party (PKR), a component party of the state ruling but federal opposition PH and formerly PR coalitions. 

Prior to his political career, Ahmad Zakiyuddin had been an engineer by profession; he is a registered member of the Board of Engineers Malaysia as a professional civil engineer with a practising certificate.

Education 
Ahmad Zakiyuddin received his secondary education at SMS Sultan Mohamad Jiwa in the town of Sungai Petani in Kedah. He then furthered his studies at the University of Salford, where he completed his A-Levels and pursued a tertiary course in civil engineering.

Engineering career 
After graduating from the University of Salford, Ahmad Zakiyuddin worked in the Malaysian Public Works Department (JKR) for 10 years. He was involved with numerous infrastructural projects, such as the township of Bandar Bertam Perdana in Northern Seberang Perai, as well as tertiary institutes and mosques in Southern Seberang Perai.

Political career 
Ahmad Zakiyuddin's first foray into politics as an ordinary member of the People's Justice Party (PKR) came in the 2013 Penang state election. He contested the Pinang Tunggal state constituency and lost in a straight fight against Roslan Saidin of Barisan Nasional (BN).

In the 2018 Penang state election, Ahmad Zakiyuddin once again went up against Roslan Saidin, the incumbent State Assemblyman for Pinang Tunggal. This time he emerged victorious, winning the constituency by a slim margin of 127 votes, despite facing a three-cornered tussle for the seat. Following his electoral win, Ahmad Zakiyuddin was appointed as the Deputy Chief Minister I of Penang by the state's Chief Minister, Chow Kon Yeow. Ahmad Zakiyuddin assumed office as the Deputy Chief Minister I on 16 May, succeeding his party colleague, Mohd Rashid Hasnon, who became the elected Member of Parliament for Batu Pahat in Johor.

Election results

Honours
  :
  Officer of the Order of the Defender of State (DSPN) – Dato’ (2015)
  Companion of the Order of the Defender of State (DMPN) – Dato’ (2018)

See also 

 Chief Minister of Penang

References 

1959 births
People from Penang
Malaysian people of Malay descent
Malaysian Muslims
People's Justice Party (Malaysia) politicians
Members of the Penang State Legislative Assembly
Penang state executive councillors
Alumni of the University of Salford
21st-century Malaysian politicians
Living people
Malaysian civil engineers